A total lunar eclipse took place on Thursday, November 7, 1957. The Moon barely edged into total eclipse for 27 minutes and 54 seconds. With the Moon just 3.5% of its diameter into the Earth's umbral shadow, the Moon may have been quite bright, but even so, this should have been worth seeing. The partial eclipse lasted for 3 hours and 27 minutes in total.

Visibility

Related lunar eclipses

Lunar year series

Half-Saros cycle
A lunar eclipse will be preceded and followed by solar eclipses by 9 years and 5.5 days (a half saros). This lunar eclipse is related to two total solar eclipses of Solar Saros 142.

See also
List of lunar eclipses
List of 20th-century lunar eclipses

References

External links

1957-11
1957 in science
November 1957 events